Coldstone could be:

Coldstone (Gargoyles), a character from the Gargoyles series.
Cold Stone Creamery, an American-based ice cream parlor chain
Coldstone (game engine), a game creation suite for the Macintosh
"Cold Stones", a 2006 episode of US drama The Sopranos
A Scottish term for a charmstone

See also
Stone Cold (disambiguation)